Michael Lax (born 10 August 1974) is a South African cricketer. He played in two first-class matches for Border in 1993/94 and 1994/95.

See also
 List of Border representative cricketers

References

External links
 

1974 births
Living people
South African cricketers
Border cricketers
Cricketers from East London, Eastern Cape